Madhukar Keche (1932 - 1993) was a Marathi writer from Maharashtra, India. He was resident of Amravati but traveled all over Maharashtra. He was also a well known poet.

His writings include:
 Biographies Rashtrasant Tukadoji Maharaj and Shri Sant Gadge Maharaj
 A collection of biographical sketches Warhadi Mandali
 Travelogue Majhi Kahi Gawe
 Novel Moti Jyanchya Poti
 Collection of short stories Akhar Angan
 Travel travelling 'Gandhi Parisar' Musings in the Gandhi Ashram Sewagram.

A Phd thesis on his work is also published.

References

Marathi-language writers
1932 births
1993 deaths